Some authors advocating patent reform have proposed the use of prizes as an alternative to patents. Critics of the current patent system, such as Joseph E. Stiglitz, say that patents fail to provide incentives for innovations which are not commercially marketable. Stiglitz provides the idea of prizes instead of patents to be awarded in order to further advance solutions to global problems such as AIDS.

Background

Patents essentially provide a temporary monopoly on a product to the first inventor or firm which comes up with the product. Patents vary in length but are designed to last long enough for the innovator to make a return on investment. The nature of patents makes them an incentive so long as the product being invented is distributed to consumers through markets. While patented products are in the market, the producer can place any price on the product, regardless of the price of production which typically dictates prices in markets. If a product is not being distributed through markets then a patent cannot provide proper incentive for innovation. Patents do however provide gain through the restriction of information to others. Stiglitz identifies this as a problem of patents for the innovation of drugs and other products being distributed not with the purpose of making a profit, but to solve global problems.

Offering a prize as opposed to a patent, according to Stiglitz, would address the lack of incentive for problems such as disease in developing countries, and it would provide products immediately affordable instead of pending a patent expiration. Awarding prizes offers a fixed amount appropriate for reimbursing research into drugs. Today, many drug companies spend much of money earned through patents on marketing and advertising as opposed to the research for the actual drugs.

Stiglitz goes on to assert that until generic versions of drugs reach the shelves, which occurs after a patent expires, the costs burden consumers due to prices not being dictated by the markets. These burdens are overwhelming in developing countries and Stiglitz suggests they be lowered by offering prizes instead of patents. Stiglitz discusses the idea of using foreign aid assistance funds to finance prizes as it would provide greater foreign aid than what funds are being used for currently.

United States
Senator Bernie Sanders of Vermont put forward legislation in the United States Senate in 2005 and 2007 under H.R. 417 and S.2210. Sanders has been a longtime proponent of Stiglitz’ ideas, and favors a system of incentives for innovation in medicine and pharmaceuticals over a system of patents, which he asserts grant company monopolies on drugs and drive up pharmaceutical prices.

The Medical Innovation Prize Fund Act S1137 and S1138

The two bills proposed on May 26, 2011 by Senator Bernie Sanders would completely remove legal barriers to the manufacture and sale of generic drugs.  The bills will give the government the right to set specific goals and direct research to certain areas of medicine.  S1137 would apply to all prescription drugs, and S1138 is focused on HIV/AIDS medications.  The bills call for both the government and private insurance companies to fund the "Medical Innovation Prize Fund".  According to the S1137 bill, the innovation fund would create a fund of .55% of GDP, $80 billion of GDP based on 2010 numbers.  S1138 calls for a .02% GDP fund for HIV/AIDS innovation prizes that amounts to about $3 billion a year.

In a statement made at a subcommittee meeting, Senator Sanders said, "It simply blew me away — and would blow anyone’s mind away — that one drug, Atripla, costs $25,000 per year".  He called this bill, “Fairly radical for the U.S. Congress.” According to estimates, proponents of the bill believe that the costs of the prizes would be offset by the introduction of generic drugs and the reduction of monopoly power in the pharmaceutical industry.  Sanders believes that these bills will save private insurers, Medicaid, and other government assistance programs money.

One of the goals of the bill is to "de-link research and development incentives from product prices" along with getting rid of patents and what the bill's author asserts to be monopoly power.  It aims to free research and development by proposing a possible "Open Source Dividend" element.  This means that a percentage of the prize money from the innovation funds would go to those persons or communities that allow access to knowledge, data, etc. to public domains and offer free access to patents.

Senator Sanders and other proponents of both bills assert that the prize funds will give incentives for manufacturers to seek innovative treatments for illnesses and diseases that are more important to society.  In addition, they state that these funds will lower drugs prices, along with what they claim to be wasteful research and development costs.  This bill has been favored by Joseph Stiglitz.

The Bill & Melinda Gates Foundation have tried such a prize fund model.  In their model, all applicants for funding from the Gates foundation must waive all claims to patents.  “A World Health Organization (WHO) report, called 'Research and Development to Meet health Needs in Developing Countries', backs prize funds, saying it is a financially viable model”

In 2012 the two bills were referred to the committee level in the Senate.  They have not been put to a vote in either the Senate or the House.  In 2009-2010 only 3% of all bills proposed in the senate were enacted.

Other areas for prize models over patents

US President Barack Obama has pushed for prizes innovation sponsoring 150 contests across 40 agencies in 2010.  NASA paid out $6 million in prizes to companies since 2005 for innovation.  Between 2000-2007 certain groups put $250 million into technologies that range from robotic arms and tuberculosis tests, according to Brian Vastag of The Washington Post.

Criticism

Criticisms of prize funds focus on the impact of prizes as limited by their size, scope, and nature.  Prizes large enough to replace patents as incentives to develop innovative new products require large up-front costs for taxpayers. According to the Global Intellectual Property Center, studies show that prizes are better at proving a concept than bringing concrete, useful technologies into existence.  Another criticism made by the Global Intellectual Property Center is that prizes will never be enough to reward lucky breaks that have brought about the most important innovations.   Also, the center argues that prizes do not create incentives to drive continuous cycle of advances and improvements because prizes are finite and limited.

The Global Intellectual Property Center also believes that prizes focus narrowly on certain acts or on the "next new thing", and that prizes can act as distractions from more significant innovations.  They also assert that prizes do not hold researchers and inventors accountable for the findings of works or creations.  The center argues that prizes in turn give rights to a product to a government, who then gives rights to the entire public.  In the future, if there are any problems or questions with the creation, or drug, it will be impossible to determine who is responsible for the flaw.

Within the pharmaceutical industry, prize theory has gotten much criticism.  One of the main criticisms is that giving rewards in the form of prize money to drug companies for producing innovative drugs will not be seen for many years while the drug is tested in the market, and that prize funds would not reward pharmaceuticals for producing different versions of drugs; “me-too” drugs.  These variations are seen as part of the bigger problem by Senator Sanders.

See also
Economics and patents
Inducement prize contest
Societal views on patents
De-linkage

References 

Patent law
Economics of intellectual property
Criticism of intellectual property